Las Consecuencias ("The Consequences") is an album by former Heroes Del Silencio front-man and lead vocalist, Enrique Bunbury.

Track listing
The album comprises 11 songs.

Certifications

References

2010 albums
Enrique Bunbury albums